Love It may refer to:

 Love it!, a British weekly magazine
 Love It (album), a 2009 Japanese album by Ai Otsuka
 "Love It", a 1979 single by Nona Hendryx
 "Love It" (song), a 2001 song by Bilal

See also
I Love It (disambiguation)